James Lock is an English television personality who is best known for being a cast member on the ITVBe reality series The Only Way Is Essex since 2013.

Life and career
In 2013, Lock joined the cast of The Only Way Is Essex for its eighth series and has been a member of the cast ever since. 

In 2020, Lock appeared on the eighth series of Celebs Go Dating.

In 2022, Lock was a cast member on the second series of Celebrity Ex on the Beach. He also appeared on Celebrity Dinner Date and an episode of the BBC Three show Eating with My Ex. He also appeared on an episode of CelebAbility.

In 2023, Lock will be a contestant on the first series of the British version of The Challenge.

Filmography

References

Year of birth missing (living people)
Living people
English television personalities
Participants in British reality television series
The Challenge (TV series) contestants